The Botswana Mining Workers' Union (BMWU) is a trade union affiliate of the Botswana Federation of Trade Unions in Botswana.

References

Botswana Federation of Trade Unions
Mining trade unions
Mining in Botswana
Organisations based in Selebi-Phikwe
Trade unions in Botswana